Dexter Morriam Keezer (24 August 1895 – June 24, 1991) was an American economist who served as president of Reed College from 1934–42.

Biography
Dexter Merriam Keezer was born Aug. 24, 1895, in Acton, Massachusetts. He graduated from Amherst College in 1920, received an M.A. from Cornell University in 1923 and a Ph.D. from the Brookings Graduate School of Economics and Government in 1925. He taught at Cornell, the University of Colorado, the University of North Carolina, and Dartmouth College.

He served as president of Reed College from 1934 to 1942. He founded the department of economics at McGraw-Hill after joining the company in 1945.

Keezer died in 1991 in Orleans, Massachusetts.

References

External links
Keezer Fund
President of Reed College

1895 births
1991 deaths
Amherst College alumni
Cornell University alumni
American business theorists
Presidents of Reed College
People from Acton, Massachusetts
People from Orleans, Massachusetts
Economists from Massachusetts
Economists from Oregon
20th-century American economists
20th-century American academics